The 5th Annual MTV Millennial Awards were held on June 3, 2017 at the Palacio de los Deportes in Mexico City, and was broadcast on June 4, 2017 through MTV Latin America. The awards celebrate the best of Latin music and the digital world of the millennial generation. The ceremony was hosted by Lele Pons and Juanpa Zurita. J Balvin and Sebastián Yatra led nominations with five each, while Lali was the biggest winner of the night, with two awards. Furthermore, Lady Gaga received the UNHCR's Change Agent Award.

Performances

Notes
  Sheeran's performance was pre-recorded.

Presenters
 Anitta and Sebastian Villalobos — presented Mexican Instagrammer of the Year
 Rudy Mancuso  and Mario Ruiz — presented Colombian Artist of the Year
 Alex Strecci and Lola Club — presented Best YouTube Collaboration 
 La Divaza and Juana Martinez — presented Best Pop Artist
 Chumel Torres — presented Male Instagrammer of the Year and Female Instagrammer of the Year 
 Tessa Ía and Axel Muñiz — introduced Natalia Lafourcade
 CD9 — introduced War for the Planet of the Apes trailer
 Los Polinesios — presented Freshest Face
 Acapulco Shore cast — presented Viral Bomb
 Facundo — presented UNHCR's Change Agent Award
 YosStop and Fernando Lozada — introduced Sebastián Yatra
 Nath Campos — presented Video of the Year
 Rudy Mancuso — presented International Hit of the Year
 Mario Bautista — presented MIAW Icon of the Year

Winners and nominees
Nominees were announced on April 24, 2017. Winners are listed in bold.

Music

Movies and Television

Digital world

References

MTV Millennial Awards
MTV Millennial Awards
MTV Millennial Awards
MTV Millennial Awards
MTV Millennial Awards
Events in Mexico City
MTV Millennial Awards, 2017